Chirawa railway station is a railway station in Jhunjhunu district, Rajasthan. Its code is CRWA. It serves Chirawa town. The station consists of 2 platforms. Passenger, Express trains halt here.

Trains

The following trains halt at Chirawa railway station in both directions:

 Delhi Sarai Rohilla–Sikar Express
 Sikar–Delhi Sarai Rohilla Intercity Express
 Kota-Hisar Express
Hisar-Kota Express

References

Railway stations in Jhunjhunu district
Jaipur railway division